Francesca DeRosa (also billed Derosa) is an American actress.

DeRosa made her debut in a 2007 episode of "Without a Trace".

In 2008, she appeared as herself in an episode of "The Bonnie Hunt Show". She followed it with six episodes of "Are You Smarter than a 5th Grader?" in 2008 and 2009. She appeared on Christmas with a Capital C in 2011, for which she also sang.

She made the first of two appearances as Sully Braginton opposite Derek Brandon, in 2012's Mickey Matson and the Copperhead Conspiracy.

Her latest work is as Sully Braginton in Pirate's Code: The Adventures of Mickey Matson, released in 2014.

Notes

External links
 

American television actresses
21st-century American actresses
Living people
Year of birth missing (living people)